Pannone is a surname. Notable people with the surname include:

 Gianfranco Pannone, Italian film director
 Ryan Pannone (born 1985), American basketball coach
 Thomas Pannone (born 1994), American baseball player

See also
 Pannone solicitors, law firm based in the UK